Hey is a premium email service launched by Basecamp in June 2020. The service may be accessed through the Hey website and through apps for macOS, Windows, Linux, Android and iOS. Due to the service's vertical integration, a Hey mailbox cannot be incorporated into other email services or stand-alone email clients.

Around the time of Hey's launch, a stand-off between Basecamp and Apple Inc. over Apple's policy on in-app purchases in apps hosted by its App Store was the cause of significant media attention upon Apple's policies.

Features
An email from a new sender requires the user to confirm whether they wish to receive emails from that sender, and if not then emails from that sender are never shown again
Blocks tracking pixels (called a spy tracker in the apps) and informs the user if an email includes tracking
A single place showing all attachments that have been received, regardless of sender

See also
Mailbox provider

References

External links

Webmail
Email clients
Proprietary cross-platform software
Internet properties established in 2020
Computer-related introductions in 2020